The John Lewis class is a class of fleet replenishment oilers which began construction in September 2018. The class will comprise twenty oilers which will be operated by Military Sealift Command to provide underway replenishment of fuel and limited amounts of dry cargo to United States Navy carrier strike groups, amphibious ready groups, and other surface forces to allow them to operate worldwide.

Design 
The John Lewis-class ships are double-hulled and constructed to commercial standards and OPNAVINST 9070.1 requirements. They classed to American Bureau of Shipping steel vessel rules. The ships have capabilities similar to the s and rely on existing technology. The ships can carry 156,000 barrels of oil and have increased dry cargo storage over the Henry J. Kaiser class. There are stations on both sides of each ship for underway replenishment of fuel and stores, and will have two dry cargo transfer rigs. The John Lewis-class ships have limited means of self-defense when delivered, including defenses against mines and torpedoes, and will be equipped with crew-served weapons which will be operated by embarked Navy Expeditionary Security Teams for limited self-defense ability against small boat attack. The ships have space, weight, and power reserved for additional self-defense systems, including close-in weapon systems (CIWS) or SeaRAM, and an anti-torpedo torpedo defense system. Even with additional self-defense systems installed the ships will still require escort if operating in a higher threat environment.

History 
On 30 June 2016, General Dynamics National Steel and Shipbuilding Company (NASSCO) was awarded detailed design and construction for six John Lewis-class replenishment oilers. NASSCO began construction on John Lewis on 20 September 2018, and began construction on Harvey Milk on 3 September 2020. In January 2020 it was announced the lead ship delivery estimate had been delayed from November 2020 until June 2021 due to delays in delivery of gear and flooding of a graving dock.

Naming 
The class is named for its lead ship, John Lewis, which in turn is named for American politician and civil rights leader John Lewis. The remaining John Lewis-class oilers will be named after prominent civil rights leaders and activists.

Ships

References

 
Auxiliary replenishment ship classes
Ships of the United States Navy